The Mexican whiptail (Aspidoscelis mexicanus) is a species of teiid lizard endemic to Mexico.

References

mexicanus
Reptiles described in 1869
Taxa named by Wilhelm Peters
Reptiles of Mexico
Taxobox binomials not recognized by IUCN